The Cagayan de Oro Convention Center officially known as the Aquilino Q. Pimentel Jr. International Convention Center  is a convention and exhibition venue complex in Cagayan de Oro, Philippines.

Republic Act No. 11845 renaming Cagayan de Oro (CDO) International Convention Center as Aquilino Q. Pimentel, Jr. lapsed into law on June 18, 2022, without the signature of President Rodrigo Duterte.

Construction
The convention center project was conceptualized by then-Senator Aquilino Pimentel, Jr. at the start of his term in 1998. Construction of the facility began on June 30, 2001 and was projected to be complete in August 2003.

However the construction of the convention center was stalled in multiple occasions. During the administration of President Gloria Macapagal Arroyo, there was difficulty in securing funds for the project. Pimentel alleged that Arroyo was blocking the release of funds for projects initiated by legislators belonging to the opposition including the convention center project. The former senator had suggested naming the facility after Arroyo's father Diosdado Macapagal, due to her parent also being a former president, in a bid to secure her support for the project. By November 2009, only 45 percent of the project was completed.

Another setback was experienced in 2012 due to an ownership dispute over the site of the facility which was only resolved in late 2016. Construction work on the main building started in February 2018.

By July 2019, the convention center is already 56 percent complete; with the main building 88 percent finished.

The Department of Public Works and Highways announced the completion of the convention center's main building on September 8, 2021.

Pimentel has proposed the site to be named after Pablo P. Magtajas who was mayor of Cagayan de Oro from 1984 to 1998.

House Bill No. (HBN) 8842 renaming Cagayan de Oro (CDO) International Convention Center as Aquilino Q. Pimentel, Jr., was approved by the House of Representatives on the third and final reading on March 22, 2021, while the Senate passed it on January 31, 2022. This lapsed into law on June 18, 2022, without the signature of President Rodrigo Duterte in accordance with Article VI Section 27 (1) of the 1987 Constitution.

Facilities
The building complex will also host a dedicated building that will house offices of the Tourism Infrastructure and Enterprise Zone Authority (TIEZA), a multistory car park building, a viewing deck, a helipad, a pavilion, and an administrative building among other facilities.

References

Buildings and structures in Cagayan de Oro
Convention centers in the Philippines
Event venues established in 2021
2021 establishments in the Philippines